The 2016–17 Butler Bulldogs men's basketball team represented Butler University in the 2016–17 NCAA Division I men's basketball season. Their head coach was Chris Holtmann, in his third year. The Bulldogs played their home games at Hinkle Fieldhouse and were members of the Big East Conference. They finished the regular season 25–9, 12–6 in Big East play to finish in second place. They lost to Xavier in the quarterfinals of the Big East tournament. The Bulldogs received an at-large bid to the NCAA tournament as a No. 4 seed in the South Region. They defeated Winthrop and Middle Tennessee to advance to the Sweet Sixteen. In the Sweet Sixteen, they lost to eventual National Champion North Carolina.

On June 9, 2017, head coach Chris Holtmann left to become the head coach at Ohio State. On June 12, the school hired Milwaukee head coach and Butler alum LaVall Jordan as head coach.

Previous season 
The Bulldogs finished the 2015–16 season with a record of 22–11, 10–8 in Big East play to finish in a tie for fourth place. They lost in the quarterfinals of the Big East tournament to Providence. The Bulldogs received an at-large bid to the NCAA tournament where they defeated Texas Tech in the First Round to advance to the Second Round where they lost to Virginia.

Off season 
Prior to the season, Butler was picked to finish sixth in a poll of Big East coaches. Kelan Martin was named to the preseason All-Big East first team.

Departures

2016 recruiting class
Butler originally signed four recruits in its 2016 class which was hailed as the best recruiting class in Butler history. However, three star point guard, Howard Washington, Jr., and Butler mutually agreed to part ways in April 2016. The class is currently ranked as 45th best in the country by 247Sports.com.

Incoming transfers

Roster

Schedule

|-
!colspan=12 style=| Exhibition

|-
!colspan=12 style=| Non-conference Regular Season

|-
!colspan=9 style=|Big East Conference Play
|-

|-
!colspan=9 style="|Big East tournament

|-
!colspan=12 style="background:#11284B; color:#FFFFFF;"| NCAA tournament

Rankings

*AP does not release post-NCAA tournament rankings

Awards

References

Butler
Butler Bulldogs men's basketball seasons
2016 in sports in Indiana
2017 in sports in Indiana
Butler